John Feetham may refer to:

 Jack Feetham, English rugby league footballer
 John Feetham (bishop), Anglican bishop in Australia